Engin Alberto Mitre (born 16 October 1981) is a Panamanian football midfielder who currently plays for Chorrillo in the Liga Profesional de Fútbol.

Club career
Nicknamed el Doctor, Mitre started his career at hometown club Plaza Amador and joined Chorrillo in December 2008.

In June 2015 he missed out on promotion to the LPF after his team SUNTRACS lost the Panamanian Second Division championship decider to Atlético Nacional. He subsequently returned to Chorrillo and the LPF.

International career
Mitre made his debut for the Panama national football team in January 2004 against El Salvador and has earned a total of 34 caps, scoring no goals. He represented his country in 11 FIFA World Cup qualification matches and was a member of the 2005 CONCACAF Gold Cup team, who finished second in the tournament and he also played at the 2007 CONCACAF Gold Cup.

His final international was a June 2007 CONCACAF Gold Cup match against the United States.

Personal life
A qualified doctor, Mitre joined the medical staff of the Panama U-17 team for the 2011 FIFA U-17 World Cup in Mexico. He has his own clinic in Paraiso, San Miguelito District.

His father Carlos Alberto Mitre also played for Panama in the 1970s.

References

External links

1981 births
Living people
Sportspeople from Panama City
Association football midfielders
Panamanian footballers
Panama international footballers
2005 UNCAF Nations Cup players
2005 CONCACAF Gold Cup players
2007 UNCAF Nations Cup players
2007 CONCACAF Gold Cup players
C.D. Plaza Amador players
Unión Deportivo Universitario players
Veraguas Club Deportivo players